Bernhard Knauß (born 25 June 1965 in Schladming) is an Austrian and later Slovenian former alpine skier who competed in the 1998 Winter Olympics and won the U.S. Pro-Ski Tour several times.

External links
 sports-reference.com
 

1965 births
Living people
Austrian male alpine skiers
Slovenian male alpine skiers
Olympic alpine skiers of Slovenia
Alpine skiers at the 1998 Winter Olympics